Andrew Dunphy (born 2000) is an Irish hurler who plays for Dublin Senior Championship club St. Brigid's and at inter-county level with the Dublin senior hurling team. He usually lines out as a corner-back.

Career

A member of the St. Brigid's club in Castleknock, Dunphy first came to prominence at schools' level with the combined Dublin North team that won the Leinster Colleges Championship in 2018. He made his first appearance on the inter-county scene as a member of the Dublin minor team during the 2017 Leinster Championship, before later captaining the under-20 team to the Leinster Championship title in 2020. Dunphy joined the Dublin senior hurling team in 2020.

Career statistics

Honours

Dublin North
Leinster Colleges Senior Hurling Championship: 2018

Dublin
Leinster Under-20 Hurling Championship: 2020 (c)

References

External links
Andrew Dunphy profile at the Dublin GAA website

2000 births
Living people
St Brigid's (Dublin) hurlers
Dublin inter-county hurlers